Velamysta is a genus of clearwing (ithomiine) butterflies, named by Richard Haensch in 1909. They are in the brush-footed butterfly family, Nymphalidae.

Species
Arranged alphabetically:
Velamysta peninna (Hewitson, 1855)
Velamysta phengites Fox, 1945
Velamysta pupilla (Hewitson, 1874)

References 

Ithomiini
Nymphalidae of South America
Nymphalidae genera
Taxa named by Richard Haensch